Jennifer Capriati was the defending champion, but decided to rest in order to compete in the WTA Tour Championships.

Kim Clijsters won the title by defeating Lisa Raymond 6–2, 6–2 in the final.

Seeds
The first two seeds received a bye into the second round.

Draw

Finals

Top half

Bottom half

References

External links
 Official results archive (ITF)
 Official results archive (WTA)

2001 Singles
SEAT Open - Singles
2001 in Luxembourgian tennis